IEC 62264 is an international standard for enterprise-control system integration. This standard is based upon ANSI/ISA-95.

Current Parts of IEC 62264 
IEC 62264 consists of the following parts detailed in separate IEC 62264 standard documents:
 Part 1:2013 Object Models and Attributes of Manufacturing Operations (Second edition 2013-05) 
 Part 2:2013 Object model attributes (Second edition 2013-06) 
 Part 3:2016 Activity models of manufacturing operations management (Second edition 2016-12) 
 Part 4:2015 Objects models attributes for manufacturing operations management integration 
 Part 5:2016 Business to manufacturing transactions
 Publicly Available Specification - Pre-standard Part 6:2016 Messaging Service Model

See also 
 ANSI/ISA-95
 Enterprise control

References

External links 
 

62264
Control engineering
Systems engineering